Orthodera ministralis, common name garden mantis or Australian green mantis, is a species of praying mantis from Australia.

Description

They have a green body with their thorax being broader than their head and abdomen. Inside of their front legs have a blue to purple spot. Adult males feature wings and females only have wing buds, which cover their abdomen. Body measures up to 4 cm in length.

Habitat
The garden mantis inhabits the whole of Australia, particularly gardens, and can often be found hidden in leafy scrub from ground to eye level. It feeds on small insects by ambushing them. They remain motionless for lengthy periods so they can ambush prey as it moves near them. The females lay eggs as a single mass within a sturdy, woody case.

See also
List of mantis genera and species

References

Mantidae
Mantodea of Oceania
Insects of Australia
Insects described in 1775
Taxa named by Johan Christian Fabricius